{{Short description|Australian ( drug mule }

Martin Eric Stephens (born 1976) is an Australian former bartender who was convicted in Indonesia for drug trafficking as a member of the Bali Nine. After a criminal trial, on 14 February 2006 Stephens was sentenced to life imprisonment. His appeal to the Indonesian Supreme Court to have the sentence reduced to 10 years was rejected in January 2011.

Alleged trafficking conspiracy
Stephens, from Towradgi, a suburb of Wollongong, New South Wales, was employed at Eurest, a catering company, where he met Renae Lawrence, Matthew Norman, and his supervisor, Andrew Chan. All four would later be convicted of drug trafficking as fellow members of the Bali Nine.

According to media reports based on the testimony of Renae Lawrence, acting under the instructions of Andrew Chan, Stephens and Lawrence departed Australia on 6 April 2005. The day before, Stephens, Lawrence, and Si Yi Chen met with Myuran Sukumaran where police allege drug smuggling tools such as sealable plastic bags, medical tape, elastic waist bands and skin tight bike shorts were stuffed into the bags of Stephens and Lawrence. Lawrence claimed she was given cash; whilst Stephens claimed that his life was threatened. Media reports claim that police records show that whilst in Bali, Lawrence was in daily contact with Chan until 13 April, when Chan changed his mobile phone number. On the same day, he instructed Stephens and Lawrence, staying at the Kuta Laguna, to change hotels. Together with Chen and Norman, Stephens and Lawrence checked into the Adhi Dharma hotel on 14 April. Indonesian police were in an adjacent room in the same hotel. Nguyen arrived on 16 April, and booked into the same hotel. The original planned departure date of 14 April from Bali was delayed as Chan suspected Australian and Indonesian police were aware of his plans.

On 17 April, Chen, Norman, and Nguyen checked out of the Adhi Dharma hotel, leaving Stephens and Lawrence in the hotel until they departed for the airport.

Arrest in Indonesia
Stephens was arrested by Indonesian police on 17 April 2005 at Ngurah Rai International Airport in Denpasar, Bali. Heroin weighing  was discovered strapped to his legs and chest, concealed underneath his clothing. Scott Rush, Michael Czugaj and Lawrence were arrested at the same time as Stephens. On 20 April 2005, graphic footage of the arrests and subsequent police questioning of Stephens and other members of the Bali Nine was aired on Australian television.

On the same day that Stephens was arrested, Indonesian police also arrested Si Yi Chen, Tan Duc Thanh Nguyen, Myuran Sukumaran and Matthew Norman at the Melasti Hotel in Kuta.  Alleged co-ringleader, Andrew Chan was also arrested the same day whilst seated on an Australian Airlines flight waiting to depart Denpasar for Sydney. At the time Chan was arrested, he was carrying three mobile phones and a boarding pass. No drugs were found in his possession.

At the time of the arrest, it was reported that Stephens, speaking with Lawrence, was recorded as saying "Should we dob them in?"
Lawrence replied:

Criticism of Australian Federal Police tipoff
Lee Rush, the father of Scott Rush, a fellow member of the Bali Nine, said that he contacted the Australian Federal Police (AFP) prior to the commission of the offence, fearing his son was travelling to Bali and would commit a drug-related crime. Rush senior claims then to have received assurances from the AFP that they would tell his son he was under surveillance to dissuade him from going through with the crime before the group's departure from Indonesia. Scott Rush's lawyers said he was never contacted. It was revealed that the AFP alerted Indonesian police that a crime was to be committed approximately two weeks before the arrests, and had commenced an investigation about ten weeks prior to the arrests. When the Bali Nine were arrested, the news of the tipoff became public and there was criticism of the role of the AFP in protecting the interests of Australian citizens. Commenting on the matter at the time, AFP Commissioner Mick Keelty was reported as saying:

Rush took action in the Federal Court of Australia against the AFP for breach of the bilateral treaty between Indonesia and Australia when information was handed by the AFP to the Indonesians. Rush's case claimed that such information should only be released by the Attorney-General. However, the Commonwealth Government maintained that the treaty only applies after a suspect is charged. The application was dismissed by the Federal Court in January 2006.

Criminal trial 
Criminal trials for the accused commenced in the Denpasar District Court on 11 October 2005. Chen, Nguyen, and Norman, all arrested at the Melasti Hotel and earning the numeric epithet, The Melasti Three, were tried together, with the remaining six defendants tried separately.

In December 2005, as the trials began, it was reported that tensions were building between the Bali Nine drug mules and Sukumaran and Chan. Several days later, lawyers acting for some members of the Bali Nine initially sought the support of the Australian Director of Public Prosecutions to intervene and lay charges for conspiracy to import drugs, so that the nine could be extradited and charged under Australian law. However, the judges hearing the trial matters in Bali called for Australia not to intervene in Indonesia's right to impose capital punishment;. Lawyers acting for Stephens claimed that the fairness of his trial was in jeopardy following comments made in the media by Indonesian Foreign Minister Hassan Wirajuda that Australians should be prepared for members of the Bali Nine to receive a death sentence, if found guilty.

During his trial, Stephens claims he was forced by Chan to travel to Bali and proceed with the smuggling. Stephens claims that Chan showed him photographs of his family going about their daily lives, and saying they would be killed if he did not cooperate, saying:

Adnan Wirawan, Stephens' lawyer, claimed that his client has been unfairly accused as the ring leader of the alleged conspiracy. "He's a human suitcase... he was being told what to do." During legal proceedings, Czugaj and Rush, fellow members of the Bali Nine who have since been convicted of drug trafficking, testified that they had never met Stephens or Lawrence until they were all arrested on 17 April 2005.

Sentencing and appeal
Sentences for the majority of the Bali Nine were handed down on 13 February 2006 and 14 February 2006. As Stephens' sentence was about to be handed down, his mother Michelle, speaking from Bali, was reported as saying:

On 14 February 2006, Stephens was sentenced to life imprisonment.

Commenting on the sentences at the time, Australian Federal Police Commissioner Keelty stated:

The Australian Prime Minister John Howard was reported as commenting:

As verdicts and sentences were handed down in the trials of the Bali Nine, additional arrests were made in Australia.

Stephens, along with eight other members of the Bali Nine, appealed the severity of their sentence. On 26 April 2006, the Indonesian Supreme Court reduced the life imprisonment sentences to 20-years for each of Lawrence, Nguyen, Chen, Czugaj and Norman, all arrested at Melasti Hotel in Kuta. Stephens' appeal was upheld.

Prison life
In December 2009, Stephens announced he planned to marry Christine Winarni Puspayanti, an Indonesian woman he met at Kerobokan Prison. Stephens met Puspayanti months after his arrest while she was visiting the prison as a part of a church group; and they married in a traditional Indonesian-style wedding in April 2011.

In 2014, Stephens and Nguyen were transferred to a prison in Malang, East Java when it was reported that they had violated prison rules.

See also 
List of Australians in international prisons
List of Australian criminals

References 

1976 births
21st-century Australian criminals
Australian drug traffickers
Australian bartenders
Living people
People from New South Wales
Australian prisoners sentenced to life imprisonment
Australian people imprisoned abroad
Prisoners sentenced to life imprisonment by Indonesia